Floyd Hall (born 4 Sept 1938) is an American business executive and sports team owner.

Life and career
Hall was born to a modest family in Oklahoma. He left school at the age of 15. He attended Southern Methodist University, but did not graduate.

Hall started working at Montgomery Ward in August 1956.  From 1970 to 1984, he was regional vice president at the Singer Company.  Later he was hired by B. Dalton Booksellers, where he was subsequently promoted to chief executive officer (CEO).  He was appointed as chairman and CEO of Target Stores in 1981. James Goldsmith appointed Hall as partner and CEO of the Grand Union grocery chain, which he controlled, in February 1984.

Hall was appointed president and CEO of Kmart, which was struggling, from 1995.

Hall was the chief executive officer of Kmart from June 1995 – 2000. During Hall's term in office, the chain sold off several specialty businesses to focus on its core discount store business, remodeled the stores into the Big Kmart format, and acquired the Martha Stewart line of household products.

In 1997, Hall formed a partnership with the state of New Jersey and Montclair State University, Floyd Hall Enterprises, which supervised construction of the 4,000-seat Yogi Berra Stadium, home field for the New Jersey Jackals baseball team, and a two-rink ice arena, Floyd Hall Arena, both located on the campus of Montclair State University. Hall sold the Jackals to Al Dorso in 2017 and the ice arena back to Montclair State in a transaction finalized in early 2020; the university then renamed the building the Montclair State University Ice Arena.

In 2006, after the New Jersey Cardinals were relocated to Pennsylvania and became the State College Spikes, Hall started a second team to play in the Cardinals’ former home of Skylands Park in Augusta, New Jersey. The team, known as the Sussex Skyhawks, began play in 2006 and won the Canadian-American Association of Professional Baseball championship two years later, but the team did not draw well and Hall folded the team after the 2010 season citing significant financial losses, the lack of an interested buyer, and the desire to focus on the Jackals and his other operations. (Oddly enough, current Jackals owner Al Dorso did the same thing that Hall did but in reverse; he started the Sussex County Miners, a replacement for the Skyhawks, and later purchased the Jackals.)

Hall was nominated  on February 10, 2006, by President George W. Bush to serve on the Amtrak Reform Board for a five-year term of office.  Hall was earlier appointed  in a recess appointment to the same position on January 4, 2006.

He is a resident of Montclair, New Jersey.

Hall completed Harvard Business School's advanced management program in 1977.

References

External links
Hall honored at St. Joseph's Charity Ball

Living people
Sears Holdings people
People from Montclair, New Jersey
Target Corporation people
Kmart
Southern Methodist University alumni
Businesspeople from Oklahoma
1938 births